The Environmental Film Festival in the Nation's Capital is the largest environmental film festival in the world.  The festival is held annually March in Washington, D.C., presenting more than 100 films to an audience of over 30,000. Often combined with thematic discussions and social events, the films screen at museums, embassies, libraries, universities and local theaters.

Mission 
The Environmental Film Festival in the Nation's Capital is the world's premier showcase of environmentally themed films. Through the annual festival, year-round events, and online resources, they seek to advance public understanding of the environment through the power of film.

History 

From the official website of the festival: "Founded by Flo Stone in 1993, the Environmental Film Festival in the Nation's Capital has become one of the world's largest and most influential showcases of environmental film and a major collaborative cultural event in Washington, D.C. Each March the Festival presents a diverse selection of high quality environmental films, including many Washington, D.C., U.S. and world premieres. Documentaries, features, animations and shorts are shown, as well as archival, experimental and children's film at venues throughout the city. Films are screened at partnering museums, embassies, libraries, universities and local theaters and are attended by large audiences. Selected to provide fresh perspectives on global environmental issues, most Festival films are accompanied by discussions with filmmakers, environmental experts and special guests, including national decision makers and thought leaders, and are free to the public. The Festival's website serves as a global resource for environmental film throughout the year."

A March 10, 2007 article from The Washington Post stated that in the first year of the festival only 1,200 people attended. In 2011 the festival had grown to 30,000 participants.

The Festival was voted Best Film Festival by the readers of Washington City Paper in 2019 and 2020.

Awards 
Documentary Award for Environmental Advocacy
2016 - "How to Let Go of the World" by Josh Fox
2015 - Racing Extinction by Louie Psihoyos
2014 - DamNation by Travis Rummel and Ben Knight

William W. Warner Beautiful Swimmers Award
2016 - "The Seer" by Laura Dunn
2015 - "TigerTiger" by George Butler

Polly Krakora Award for Artistry in Film
2016 - The Birth of Saké by Erik Shirai 
2015 - Monsoon by Sturla Gunnarsson
2014 - "Once Upon A Forest" by Luc Jacquet
2013 - Harmony by Stuart Sender
2012 - The Tsunami and the Cherry Blossom by Lucy Walker
2011 - Oil Rocks: City Above the Sea by Marc Wolfensberger
2010 - The Music Tree by Otavio Juliano

Eric Moe Sustainability Award
2016 - "Bluebird Man" by Matthew Podolsky and Neil Paprocki
2015 - "Silent River" by Jason Jaacks and Steve Fisher
2014 - "Amazing Grace" by Rowan Pybus

Venues 
Films are screened at partnering museums, embassies, libraries, universities and local theaters. Some of the venues include:

References

External links
Official EFF Website

Film festivals in Washington, D.C.
Environmental film festivals in the United States
Film festivals established in 1993